East Line Union Cemetery , also known as the Armstrong Corners Cemetery is a cemetery, located at the corner of Round Lake road (county road 80) and East Line road (county road 82) in the southwest corner of Malta, New York, in Saratoga County. The cemetery was designated as a historic landmark by the town of Malta in 1993.

History
Although not formally incorporated until September 6, 1919, graves within the cemetery date back to 1700s with the oldest being from 1785.  The cemetery contains the graves of 20 veterans of the American Revolution. There are also over 50 unmarked graves within the grounds.

The East Line Union Cemetery is operated by the Nonprofit organization East Line Union Cemetery Association INC.

External links 
 Photos of individual grave stones

References

Cemeteries in Saratoga County, New York